David John Lodge CBE (born 28 January 1935) is an English author and critic. A literature professor at the University of Birmingham until 1987, some of his novels satirise academic life, notably the "Campus Trilogy" – Changing Places: A Tale of Two Campuses (1975), Small World: An Academic Romance (1984) and Nice Work (1988). The second two were shortlisted for the Booker Prize. Another theme is Roman Catholicism, beginning from his first published novel The Picturegoers (1960). Lodge has also written television screenplays and three stage plays. After retiring, he continued to publish literary criticism. His edition of Twentieth Century Literary Criticism (1972) includes essays on 20th-century writers such as T. S. Eliot. In 1992, he published The Art of Fiction, a collection of essays on literary techniques with illustrative examples from great authors, such as Point of View (Henry James), The Stream of Consciousness (Virginia Woolf) and Interior Monologue (James Joyce), beginning with Beginning and ending with Ending.

Biography
David Lodge was born in Brockley, south-east London. His family home until 1959 was 81 Millmark Grove, a residential street of 1930s terraced houses between Brockley Cross and Barriedale. His father, a violinist, played in the orchestra pit of south London cinemas accompanying silent films. Lodge's first published novel The Picturegoers (1960) draws on early experiences in "Brickley" (based on Brockley) and his childhood home, which he revisits again in later novels, Therapy (1995), Deaf Sentence (2008) and Quite A Good Time to be Born: A Memoir (2015). World War II forced Lodge and his mother to evacuate to Surrey and Cornwall. He attended the Catholic St Joseph's Academy, Blackheath.

University studies
In 1952, Lodge entered University College, London, where he gained a first-class Bachelor of Arts degree in 1955. There he met his future wife, Mary Frances Jacob, as a fellow student, when they were 18. Meanwhile, he wrote a first, unpublished novel (1953): The Devil, the World and the Flesh. After graduating from university, Lodge spent two years in the Royal Armoured Corps on national service, which provided a basis for his novel Ginger You're Barmy. He then returned to London University, earning a Master of Arts in 1959 for a thesis on "The Catholic Novel from the Oxford Movement to the Present Day".

Family and early career
In 1959, Lodge and Jacob married at the age of 24. Lodge later said, "It seems extraordinary now. I had no prospects, no job, little money but it never bothered me. We didn't really want children at the point they came along, but we got on with it." They had children in 1960 and 1963, a son and a daughter, and a second son, Christopher, born in 1966 with Down Syndrome.

From 1959 to 1960, Lodge taught English in London for the British Council. In 1960, he gained a job as a lecturer at the University of Birmingham, where he was preparing a PhD thesis on the Oxford Movement. At Birmingham, Lodge met the novelist Malcolm Bradbury, who was to become his "closest writer friend"; the example of Bradbury's comic writing was, according to Lodge, a major influence on the development of his own work in this respect. In 1963, Lodge collaborated with Bradbury and another student, James Duckett, on a satirical revue for the Birmingham Repertory Theatre entitled Between These Four Walls, performed in the autumn of 1963. The cast included Julie Christie. During the performance of a certain skit that involved a radio being played on stage, Lodge and the audience heard news of the assassination of John F. Kennedy: In August 1964, Lodge and his family went to the United States, on a scholarship from the Harkness Commonwealth Fellowship. It required Lodge to travel at least three months out of twelve in the United States, with a car provided by the donor. The family first lived in Providence, Rhode Island, where David Lodge followed the American literature course at Brown University. During this period, free of teaching obligations, Lodge was able to complete a third novel, The British Museum Is Falling Down. Lodge's original title for the novel was The British Museum Has Lost Its Charm, a line from a George and Ira Gershwin song, but he was refused permission to use it by the Gershwin Publishing Corporation. In March 1965 the family went on a trip across the country, eventually moving to San Francisco.

In 1966, Lodge published his first book of academic criticism, Language of Fiction, and in 1967 defended his doctoral thesis for a PhD in English awarded in 1967 by Birmingham University.

Later career
From 1967 to 1987, Lodge continued his academic career at the University of Birmingham, becoming Professor of English Literature in 1976, while writing several more novels and essays. In 1969, he became an associate professor at the University of California, Berkeley. Lodge retired from his post at Birmingham in 1987 to become a full-time writer: He retains the title of Honorary Professor of Modern English Literature and continues to live in Birmingham. Some of his papers are housed in the University Library's Special Collections. In 1997, Lodge was made a Chevalier de l'Ordre des Arts et Lettres by the French Ministry of Culture. In the 1998 New Years Honours list, he was appointed CBE for his services to literature.

Works

Overview
Lodge's first published novels evoke the atmosphere of post-war England (for example, The Picturegoers (1960)). The theme occurs in later novels, through the childhood memories of certain characters (Paradise News, 1992; Therapy, 1995). The war is covered in Out of the Shelter (1970), while Ginger You're Barmy (1962) draws on Lodge's experience of military service in the 1950s. The Guardian review of the 2011 reissue of Ginger You're Barmy, called the novel "an impressively humane and feelingly political indictment of a tawdry postwar compromise" and "a moving glimpse of a world on the cusp of change".

Lodge was brought up a Catholic and has described himself as an "agnostic Catholic". Many of his characters are Catholic and their Catholicism, particularly the relationship between Catholicism and sexuality, is a major theme. The British Museum Is Falling Down (1965) and How Far Can You Go? (1980; published in the US as Souls and Bodies), examine the difficulties faced by orthodox Catholics due to the prohibition of artificial contraception. Other novels where Catholicism plays an important part include Small World (in the character of Persse), Paradise News (1991) and Therapy (1995). In Therapy, the protagonist Laurence Passmore ("Tubby") has a breakdown after his marriage fails . He reminisces about his adolescent courtship with his first girlfriend at a Catholic youth club and seeks her out while she is on a pilgrimage to Santiago de Compostela. Lodge has said that if read chronologically, his novels depict an orthodox Roman Catholic becoming "less and less so as time went on".

Several of Lodge's novels satirise the academic world. The Campus Trilogy (Changing Places, Small World and Nice Work) are set at a fictional English Midland university of "Rummidge", modelled on Birmingham. (The name "Rummidge" appears to be derived from Brummagem, the local nickname for Birmingham, by removing the first and last letters and altering the spelling.) The novels share characters, notably the Rummidge English literature lecturer Philip Swallow and his American counterpart, Professor Morris Zapp, who aspires to be "the highest paid teacher of Humanities in the world". Swallow and Zapp first cross paths in Changing Places, where they swap jobs for an exchange scheme (and later, swap wives). Lodge has called the plot of the novel "a narrative transformation of the thematic material and the socio-cultural similarities and differences I had perceived between Birmingham and Berkeley," during his visiting professorship.

Other fictional universities appear in Lodge's novels. Persse McGarrigle in Small World is a doctoral student at a fictional University College Limerick, the book having been written before the foundation of a real University of Limerick. Another campus novel, Thinks..., is set in a fictional University of Gloucester, before the foundation of the University of Gloucestershire.

Lodge's novels cover the world of business in Nice Work, that of television in Therapy, and deafness and Alzheimer's disease in Deaf Sentence. The last draws on Lodge's own hearing problems: "I hate my deafness; it's a comic infirmity as opposed to blindness which is a tragic infirmity". Lodge has said of his own work, "Each of my novels corresponds to a particular phase or aspect of my own life [but] this does not mean they are autobiographical in any simple, straightforward sense."

Two of Lodge's recent novels follow the lives of authors: Author, Author (2004) about Henry James and A Man of Parts (2011) about H. G. Wells. Author, Author suffered from comparison with Colm Tóibín's novel about Henry James, The Master, published six months earlier and then shortlisted for the Booker Prize. Most reviews of Lodge's novel dwelt on its unfortunate timing. Lodge wrote about the experience in The Year of Henry James (2006).

In 2015, Quite a Good Time to Be Born was published: an autobiography covering Lodge's life from 1935 to 1975.

Influences and allusions
Lodge's major influences include English Catholic novelists (the subject of his MA dissertation), notably Graham Greene. Of his contemporaries, he has been compared most often to his friend Malcolm Bradbury, also an exponent of the campus novel. Lodge has acknowledged this debt:

"The British Museum Is Falling Down was the first of my novels that could be described as in any way experimental. Comedy, it seemed, offered a way of reconciling a contradiction, of which I had long been aware, between my critical admiration for the great modernist writers, and my creative practice, formed by the neo-realist, anti-modernist writing of the 1950s. My association with Malcolm Bradbury, and the example of his own work in comedy, was therefore a crucial factor in this development in my writing." Lodge says he "was once rung up by a man to settle a bet by declaring whether I was the same person as Malcolm Bradbury."

As an academic, Lodge was an early UK proponent of the work of Mikhail Bakhtin. Lodge also alludes frequently in his novels to other literary works. The British Museum Is Falling Down is influenced by Mrs Dalloway by Virginia Woolf and Ulysses by James Joyce in that all of the action takes place in one day. The novel is mostly seen from the point of view of Adam Appleby, but the last chapter contains a long stream-of-consciousness section from the point of view of Adam's wife Barbara, modelled on Molly Bloom's famous soliloquy at the end of Ulysses. The novel contains a number of other passages which parody well-known writers, a fact not recognised by most reviewers when it was first published.

Small World makes constant reference to Arthurian legend, in the plot, character names and allusions made by the characters (all academics). Lodge says of the novel's genesis,

Dissemination and reception
Lodge's work first came to wider notice in Britain in 1975, when he won the Hawthornden prize for Changing Places. He went on to win the Whitbread Book of the Year award in 1980 for How Far Can You Go? and the Sunday Express Book of the Year in 1988 for Nice Work. Two of his early novels were reissued during this period (Ginger You're Barmy, 1962/1982, and The British Museum is Falling Down, 1965/1981). His novels appeared in paperback in the 1960s with Pan and Panther Books, with Penguin Books from 1980 and with Vintage Publishing (Random House Group) since 2011. Vintage has reissued most of his earlier work. Lodge has been shortlisted for the Booker Prize twice, for Small World and Nice Work, and in 1989, Lodge chaired the Booker Prize judges. His 1970 novel Out of the Shelter was long-listed for the Lost Man Booker Prize in 2010. Anthony Burgess called Lodge "one of the best novelists of his generation".

International publication
Lodge's work first received recognition in France in the early 1990s, after the publication by Rivages of two of his novels, Nice Work and Changing Places. These were followed in 1991 by Small World and The British Museum Is Falling Down. Since then almost all his works of fiction have been translated – his new works fairly quickly. His present publisher in France is Payot et Rivages. Publication of his theoretical works in France began later, beginning in 2003 with Consciousness and the Novel. The earlier works of this area remained unpublished in France, except The Art of Fiction. His books are routinely translated into other languages, including German, Spanish, Italian, Japanese, Portuguese, Russian, Czech, Polish and Turkish.

Narrative techniques
In The Art of Fiction (1992), Lodge studied, through examination of extracts from novels, various stylistic devices (repetition, variation in levels of language, etc.) and narrative techniques (varying viewpoints, defamiliarisation, etc.). Lodge self-consciously uses many of these techniques in his own novels. For example, in Paradise News (1991) the narration is mostly third-person point of view, but there are also first-person narratives (diary and autobiography, letters, postcards, emails) and various other documents, such as theoretical writings on tourism. In Therapy (1995) the bulk of the novel is told through the protagonist's diary, but there are other texts, presented as written by minor characters about the main character. It is eventually revealed that these were all written by the main character, as part of a therapy exercise.

Television
Two of Lodge's novels have been adapted into television serials: Small World (1988), and Nice Work (1989). Nice Work was adapted by Lodge himself and filmed at the University of Birmingham. He also adapted his play The Writing Game for television (1995).

In 1994 Lodge adapted Dickens's Martin Chuzzlewit for a BBC series.

Theatre
Lodge has written three plays: The Writing Game, Home Truths (which he later turned into a novella), and Secret Thoughts (based on his novel Thinks...).

In his autobiography Quite a Good Time To Be Born: a Memoir, 1935–75 (2015), Lodge notes that The Old Rep was one of his favourite theatres, with a long distinguished history and the likes of Laurence Olivier, Edith Evans, Ralph Richardson, Albert Finney and Derek Jacobi performing there. He referred to the theatre as "a gem", but noted that shabby as it was then, he could not have had a better venue for his first attempt at writing for the professional stage.

The Writing Game is about the staff, teachers and students at a residential course for writers. The action is interspersed with readings by the characters of their own works in progress. According to Lodge, the play "originated in the experience of teaching such a course myself – not because its plot bears any resemblance to what happened on that course, but because it struck me that the bare situation possessed the classic dramatic unities of time, place and action. Indeed it would be true to say that I invented the plot of my play to fulfil the dramatic possibilities inherent in the situation." The play opened at the Birmingham Repertory Theatre on 13 May 1990 and ran for three weeks. An American production was staged at the American Repertory Theatre in Cambridge, Massachusetts in March 1991. Lodge later adapted the play for television. It was broadcast on Channel 4 on Sunday 18 February 1996, attracting 1.2 million viewers.

Home Truths was performed at the Birmingham Rep in 1998. The story mainly focuses on Adrian Ludlow, a semi-retired writer interviewed by Fanny Tarrant, a journalist famous for sarcastic portrayals. Lodge later rewrote it as a novella of the same name.

Lodge adapted his novel Thinks ... as a two-character play, Secret Thoughts, which opened at the Octagon Theatre, Bolton on 12 May 2011. The Stage called it "an intriguing, intensely witty, brainy play.... one of the most compelling two-handers imaginable." The Guardian review said that "Lodge's novel boils down neatly into an intellectually and erotically charged dialogue on the nature of the mind," yet felt that "Lodge cannot quite eradicate the sense that some of the cerebral jousting has a more natural home in a novel than on stage." Secret Thoughts won Best New Play at the Manchester Theatre Awards, hailed as a "bracing and ambitious production that wowed everyone who saw it."

Awards and recognition
Winner of the Hawthornden Prize and the Yorkshire Post Fiction Prize for Changing Places
Whitbread Book of the Year (1980) for How Far Can You Go?
Shortlisted for the Booker Prize (1984) for Small World
Shortlisted for the Booker Prize (1988) for Nice Work
Winner of the Sunday Express Book of the Year award (1988) for Nice Work
Regional winner and finalist for the Commonwealth Writers Prize (1996) for Therapy
Fellow of the Royal Society of Literature
The television serialisation of Nice Work, which he adapted, won the Royal Television Society's Award for best Drama serial in 1989 and a Silver Nymph at the International Television Festival, Monte Carlo, 1990.
Secret Thoughts, adapting his own novel Thinks..., won Best New Play award in the Manchester Theatre Awards at the Octagon Theatre, Bolton.

Bibliography

Fiction
The Picturegoers, 1960
Ginger You're Barmy, 1962
The British Museum Is Falling Down, 1965
Out of the Shelter, 1970
Changing Places: A Tale of Two Campuses, 1975
How Far Can You Go? (US edition: Souls and Bodies), 1980
Small World: An Academic Romance, 1984
Nice Work, 1988
Paradise News, 1991
A David Lodge Trilogy, 1993 – single volume comprising Changing Places, Small World and Nice Work
Therapy, 1995
The Man Who Wouldn't Get Up: And Other Stories, 1998
Home Truths, 1999 (novella, written from original play)
Thinks ..., 2001
Author, Author, 2004
Deaf Sentence, 2008
A Man of Parts (H.G. Wells), 2011
The Man Who Wouldn't Get Up and Other Stories (expanded edition), 2016

Non-fiction
Language of Fiction, 1966
Graham Greene, 1966
The Novelist at the Crossroads, 1971
Evelyn Waugh, 1971
Twentieth Century Literary Criticism, 1972
The Modes of Modern Writing, 1977
Working with Structuralism, 1981
Write On, 1986
After Bakhtin, 1990
The Art of Fiction, 1992
Modern Criticism and Theory: A Reader — 1992
The Practice of Writing — 1997
Consciousness and the Novel — 2003
The Year of Henry James: The Story of a Novel, 2006
Lives in Writing — 2014

Autobiography
Quite a Good Time To Be Born: a Memoir, 1935–75 – 2015
Writer's Luck: A Memoir: 1976-1991 – 2018
Varying Degrees of Success: A Memoir: 1992-2020 – 2020

Theatre
The Writing Game, 1990
Home Truths, 1999
Secret Thoughts (based on Thinks...), 2011

Adaptations for television
Small World – 1988
Nice Work – 1989
Martin Chuzzlewit – 1994
The Writing Game – 1995

References

Further reading
Daniel Ammann. David Lodge and the Art-and-Reality Novel. Heidelberg: Universitätsverlag C. Winter, 1991. 
Bernard Bergonzi. David Lodge (Writers and Their Work). Tavistock, Devon: Northcote House Publishers, 1995. 
Bruce K. Martin. David Lodge. New York: Twayne, 1999.

External links

David Lodge Biography

David Lodge Living under a deaf sentence, Sunday Times, 20 April 2008.
David Lodge Papers – University of Birmingham, Cadbury Research Library, Special Collections

1935 births
Living people
Academics of the University of Birmingham
Alumni of the University of Birmingham
Alumni of University College London
English agnostics
English literary critics
English satirists
Fellows of the Royal Society of Literature
Harkness Fellows
People educated at St Joseph's Academy, Blackheath
People from Brockley
Writers of modern Arthurian fiction
20th-century English novelists
21st-century British novelists
Royal Armoured Corps soldiers
20th-century British Army personnel